KNLS is an international shortwave radio station near Anchor Point, Alaska, United States. The station is operated by World Christian Broadcasting, a non-profit company based in the United States. KNLS broadcasts 20 hours a day of Christian-themed programming in Chinese, English and Russian.

History

The idea for KNLS came about during World War II, when Maurice Hall, a young Army Signal Corps officer, was involved in delivering shortwave radio transmitters to the Yalta Conference so that President Franklin D. Roosevelt could stay informed of news from Washington. Hall, a devout Christian, realized that Christian programming could also be sent to the entire world in the same way. After World War II, Hall became a minister, educator and missionary, but still dreamed of an international shortwave station that would reach the entire world with Gospel messages.

In 1976, World Christian Broadcasting Corporation was formed and work began on making the station a reality. The following year, Lowell Perry, one of the founding directors, was killed in a plane crash during a mission to find a transmitter site. In 1979, land was purchased in Alaska and a transmitter was built.

KNLS signed on the air July 23, 1983, broadcasting ten hours a day in Mandarin Chinese and Russian and reaching roughly one-third of the world. English was added later. As the Soviet Union’s empire fell apart, listeners from those countries began writing and requesting Bibles and other religious materials. In 2005, the station signed on a second transmitter in Alaska.

KNLS today

KNLS is on the air each day for ten hours in Mandarin, five in Russian and five in English. Programming is produced at the station’s Operations Center in Franklin, Tennessee, a suburb of Nashville. Programs are presented in a magazine-style format and provide Bible and religious teaching segments and reports about life in America as well as music.

KNLS never asks listeners to send money. The station is funded by individuals, churches and other groups. The Bibles and other materials that listeners request are sent free of charge.

Broadcasts

Chinese broadcast
Ed Ho is host for the Chinese hour and is assisted by contributors including Edward Short, Salina Ho and Shu-Mei Lee. Segments include Spiritual Stories, Daily Bread, Happy Family and an English tutorial, along with hymns.

Russian broadcast
Constantin Chernushenko, a physician by training, is host of the Russian broadcast. Features include Famous Russians, a spiritual biography series; Book of Books, a Bible teaching segment; Parables of Jesus; and feature reports from the worlds of science and entertainment and other topics of general interest. Contributors to the Russian broadcast include Marina Kabulova, Galina Koval, Igor Ponomarev.

English broadcast
Rob Scobey produces and co-hosts the English hour with Lucy Grant. Features include Author’s Journal, First Person and Profiles in Christian Music. Also on the English broadcast is a prayer lesson presented by evangelist Andy Baker, whose segment was heard by missionary Gracia Burnham during the time she was held captive by terrorist rebels in the Philippines. Burnham references the broadcast in her book, In the Presence of My Enemies.

External links
World Christian Broadcasting’s website
KNLS Mandarin website
KNLS Russian website
KNLS English website

Bibliography
“Broadcaster’s Dream Wins ACU Award.” Abilene Reporter-News, February 20, 1991
Burnham, Gracia with Merrill, Dean. In the Presence of My Enemies. Wheaton, Illinois: Tyndale, 2003, pp. 255–256.
“Indian Ocean Adventure” – World Christian Broadcasting brochure, 2008

References

NLS
Shortwave radio stations in the United States
Radio stations established in 1976
1976 establishments in Alaska